Multiple State Assemblies of India went to elections in 2008.

Legislative Assembly elections

The first batch of elections for the year were announced by the Election Commission of India (ECI) on 14 January 2008. This included the elections to the Legislative Assemblies of the states of Meghalaya, Nagaland and Tripura. Elections in all polling stations of all three states were conducted using electronic voting machines (EVMs).

Elections to the state Assembly of Karnataka was announced by the ECI on 2 April 2008. This was the first election to be held under the new boundaries drawn up the Delimitation Commission of India. The elections were split into three phases. Elections in all polling stations of the state were conducted using EVMs.

Elections in four states - Chhattisgarh, Madhya Pradesh, Mizoram and Rajasthan - and in the National Capital Territory of Delhi (NCT) were announced by the ECI on 14 October 2008. Of these, only Chhattisgarh would have elections in two phases. All others would have a single phase election. Counting for all constituencies were held on the same day. All these elections were held in accordance with constituencies newly delimited by the Delimitation Commission of India. As has become the practice, EVMs would be used in all polling stations of all constituencies. Elections dates in Madhya Pradesh and Mizoram were subsequently amended by a new notice passed by the ECI on 29 October 2008.

On 19 October 2008, the ECI announced elections to the state Assembly of Jammu and Kashmir. EVMs were used in all polling stations across the state. Taking into account various factors including weather, academic schedules and law & order situation in the state, the election is scheduled as a 7 phase marathon.

*1 In Meghalaya, the Indian National Congress (INC) was the single largest party and was invited by the Governor to form the Government. However, their Chief Minister D. D. Lapang was unable to secure enough support in the Assembly. The Meghalaya Progressive Alliance (MPA) is a post election alliance formed by the Nationalist Congress Party (NCP), United Democratic Party (UDP), Hill State People's Democratic Party (HPDP) and others including two independents

*2 In Nagaland, the Democratic Alliance of Nagaland (DAN) retained control of the government. The single largest party in the Nagaland Assembly was the Nagaland People's Front (NPF) whose leader formed the new Government.

Chhattisgarh

Delhi

Jammu and Kashmir

Karnataka

Madhya Pradesh

Meghalaya

Mizoram

Nagaland

Rajasthan

Tripura

Local body elections
2008 Uttarakhand local body elections

See also
N. Gopalaswami

References

External links

 Election Commission of India

 
Elections in India by year